Jean-Luc Sassus (4 October 1962 – 22 May 2015) was a French international footballer who played as a defender. He died of a heart attack on 22 May 2015.

Sassus began his football career with Toulouse, before playing professionally for Cannes, PSG, Lyon and Saint-Étienne.  He won Ligue 1 with PSG in 1994.

After he retired from playing football, Sassus became a player's agent.

Honours
Paris Saint-Germain
 Coupe de France: 1993
 Ligue 1: 1994

References

External links
 
 http://www.fff.fr/servfff/historique/historique.php?id=SASSUS%20Jean-Luc

1962 births
2015 deaths
Sportspeople from Tarbes
Association football defenders
French footballers
France international footballers
Toulouse FC players
AS Cannes players
Paris Saint-Germain F.C. players
Olympique Lyonnais players
AS Saint-Étienne players
Footballers from Occitania (administrative region)